Alexandru Grab (born 13 December 1977) is a Moldavian football midfielder who plays for FC Olimpia.

Club statistics
Total matches played in Moldavian First League: 44 matches - 1 goal

References

External links

Profile at FC Olimpia

1977 births
Moldovan footballers
Living people
Association football midfielders